Wynford is a surface light rail transit (LRT) stop under construction on Line 5 Eglinton, a new line that is part of the Toronto subway system in Ontario, Canada. It will be located in the Don Mills neighbourhood at the intersection of Eglinton Avenue and Wynford Drive just east of the Don Valley Parkway. It is scheduled to open in 2023.

The stop is located in the middle of Eglinton Avenue East, just west of the bridge over Wynford Drive. The stop has parallel side platforms accessible by a signalized pedestrian crosswalk across Eglinton Avenue at the east end of the platforms. In addition to the existing stairs from Wynford Drive, there will be wheelchair-accessible pedestrian walkways along the curved ramps connecting eastbound Eglinton Avenue to Wynford Drive, and from Wynford Drive to Eglinton Avenue westbound.

Surface connections 

, the following are the proposed connecting routes that would serve this station when Line 5 Eglinton opens:

References

External links

Line 5 Eglinton stations